Khoun Laboravy (born 25 August 1988) is a Cambodian former footballer who last played for Boeung Ket in Cambodian League. Despite playing mostly as a striker, he has played in a wider position. During his career, he served as captain for both club and the Cambodian National Team. Joining Boeungket in 2014, he helped the club become champion of the Metfone Cambodian League twice, in 2016 and 2017.

Career
After spending 6 years with Svay Rieng based club Preah Khan Reach Svay Rieng FC , Boravy moved Boeung Ket FC in 2015, where he was crowned captain and has since won 2 Cambodian League titles.

In early 2018 Boravy was heavily linked with Thai club Ratchaburi Mitr Phol F.C., where he was invited to a week long trial. But after much speculations from fans and media, the club instead chose to sign Filipino striker Mark Hartmann who was a free agent at the time,  after being released by fellow Thai club Ubon UMT United F.C. Boravy ultimately signed for Thai League 3 side Surat Thani F.C.

International goals
Scores and results list Cambodia's goal tally first.

Honours

Club
Svay Rieng
Cambodian League: 2013
Hun Sen Cup: 2011, 2012
Boeung Ket Angkor
 Cambodian League: 2016,2017
 2015 Mekong Club Championship: Runner up

Individual
Cambodian League Golden Boot: 2013
Hun Sen Cup Golden Boot: 2011, 2012, 2014, 2017

References

1988 births
Living people
Cambodian footballers
Cambodia international footballers
Cambodian expatriate footballers
Preah Khan Reach Svay Rieng FC players
Boeung Ket Rubber Field players
People from Kampong Cham province
Association football forwards